Century Mine Airport  is an airport serving Century Mine, Queensland, Australia.

See also
 List of airports in Queensland

References

Airports in Queensland